Werneuchen is a town in Brandenburg, Germany, in the district of Barnim northeast of Berlin within the metropolitan area. Most of the population of Werneuchen commutes to Berlin.

Demography

International relations

Werneuchen is twinned with:
 Dziwnów, Poland

References

External links

Localities in Barnim